is a Japanese football player who plays as a defender. He plays for BTOP Thank Kuriyama.

Playing career
Hama was born in Hokkaido on June 14, 1998. He joined J1 League club Hokkaido Consadole Sapporo, winning promotion from the youth team in 2017. He later joined Kataller Toyama on loan from the 2021 season, but as injures struck since then, he only played a single match for them, against FC Hokuriku, on a 8-0 win for the 2021 Emperor's Cup.

On 14 January 2023, Hama was officially transferred to Hokkaido Soccer League club BTOP Thank Kuriyama, joining the club ahead of the 2023 season.

Career statistics

Club
Last update: start from 2023 season.

References

External links

1998 births
Living people
Association football people from Hokkaido
Japanese footballers
J1 League players
J3 League players
Hokkaido Consadole Sapporo players
Kataller Toyama players
Association football defenders